Gigi Sammarchi (Bologna, 2 November 1949) and Andrea Roncato (San Lazzaro di Savena, 7 March 1947) are an Italian former comedy duo who worked on stage, films and television as Gigi e Andrea.

History 
The couple started performing together in small theaters, cabarets and hostelries in Bologna in the second half of the 1970s.

They debuted in 1978 on the Rai 1 variety show Io e la Befana. The year before they had appeared for the first time on TV in A modo mio, directed by Memo Remigi.

In the 1980s, the couple starred and co-starred in several comedy films which were usually badly received by critics but of commercial success. The same period, their presence on the small screen also became more intense, especially on Fininvest variety shows and television films.

In the 1990s, having reached a more than respectable success, the couple split in order to pursue solo projects.

Filmography

Films 
1980 - Qua la mano, directed by Pasquale Festa Campanile
1982 - I camionisti, directed by Flavio Mogherini
1983 - Acapulco, prima spiaggia... a sinistra, directed by Sergio Martino
1984 - Se tutto va bene siamo rovinati, directed by Sergio Martino 
1984 - L'allenatore nel pallone, directed by Sergio Martino
1985 - Mezzo destro, mezzo sinistro, directed by Sergio Martino
1985 - I pompieri, directed by Neri Parenti
1987 - Il lupo di mare, directed by Maurizio Lucidi
1987 - Rimini Rimini, directed by Sergio Corbucci
1987 - Tango blu, directed by Alberto Bevilacqua

Television 
1986 - Doppio misto
1987 - 1989 - Don Tonino

Television shows 
1978 - Io e la Befana
1978 - 1979 - Domenica in
1980 - C'era due volte
1981 - Tutto compreso
1981 - Hello Goggi
1983 - Premiatissima
1984 - Risatissima
1985 - Supersanremo 1985
1986 - Grand Hotel
1987 - Festival
1989 - 1990 - Sabato al circo
1990 - Bellissime
1990 - Risate il Capodanno
1991 - Bellezze al bagno
1991 - Il ficcanaso
1992 - Luna di miele
1992 - Il TG delle vacanze
1993 - Risate di cuore
1993 - Ma mi faccia il piacere
1995 - Regalo di Natale

Awards 
2002 - Career award given to Gigi e Andrea at Festival del Cabaret by municipality of Martina Franca.

References

External links 

Italian comedy duos
Italian male film actors
Italian male stage actors
Italian television personalities